Sir Thomas Dyke, 1st Baronet (c. 1650 – 31 October 1706) was an English Tory politician who sat in the House of Commons between 1685 and 1698.

Dyke was the son of Sir Thomas Dyke and his wife Catharine Bramstone, daughter of Sir John Bramstone, of Skreenes, Essex. He was educated at Westminster School and Christ Church, Oxford. He entered Middle Temple in 1667 and later travelled abroad. He lived at Horeham, in Sussex and was created a baronet, of Horeham in the County of Sussex, on 3 March 1677. From 1677 to 1679 he was a commissioner for assessment in Sussex.

Dyke was elected Member of Parliament (MP) for Sussex in 1685 and held the seat until 1689. During this period, as a high church Anglican, he was in disagreement with King James II, which caused an interruption to his term as J.P. and Deputy Lieutenant. In 1689 he was elected MP for East Grinstead and held the seat until 1698. He was commissioner of Public Accounts in 1696.

Dyke died aged 56.

Dyke married Philadelphia Nutt, the daughter of Thomas Nutt, of Selmeston, Sussex. Their son Thomas succeeded to the baronetcy and their daughter Philadelphia married Lewis Stephens, D.D.

References

 

1650s births
1706 deaths
Year of birth uncertain
Baronets in the Baronetage of England
Civil servants in the Audit Office (United Kingdom)
English MPs 1685–1687
English MPs 1689–1690
English MPs 1690–1695
English MPs 1695–1698